HMS Bittern was a Vickers three-funnel, 30-knot destroyer ordered by the Royal Navy under the 1895 – 1896 Naval Estimates.  She was the fourth ship to carry this name since it was introduced in 1796 for an 18-gun sloop, sold in 1833.

Construction and career
She was laid down as yard number 249 on 17 February 1896 at the Barrow Shipbuilding Company shipyard at Barrow-in-Furness and launched on 10 October 1896.  During her builder's trials she made her contracted speed requirement. In 1897 during the construction of these ships, the Barrow Shipbuilding Company was purchased by Vickers, Sons and Maxim and renamed as the Naval Construction and Armaments Shipyard. She was completed and accepted by the Royal Navy in January 1899. After commissioning, she was assigned to the Chatham Division of the Harwich Flotilla.  She was deployed in Home Waters for her entire service life.

In January 1900 Bittern replaced  in the Medway Instructional flotilla after the latter had a breakdown in her machinery and was paid off for a refit.

On 30 August 1912 the Admiralty directed all destroyer classes were to be designated by alpha characters starting with the letter 'A'. After 30 September 1913, she was known as a C-class destroyer and had the letter 'C' painted on the hull below the bridge area and on either the fore or aft funnel.

World War I
She remained in this deployment until her loss.

SS Clan Sutherland
On 17 April 1917, the Clan Line's steamship  was on a voyage from Bombay, India to Glasgow carrying 1,000 tons of manganese ore and 3,000 tons of general cargo. The 62 crewmen abandoned ship as Clan Sutherland was badly damaged, without power and with her rudder jammed at 15° to port. She was also in danger of breaking in two. HMS Bittern was nearby and rendered assistance with Admiralty tugs Fortitude, Flintshire and Woonda, and HM Armed Trawler Lois. It was decided to beach the foundering steamer at Dartmouth.

It was two days before Captain Calderwood of Clan Sutherland was granted permission from the Admiralty to board his ship. On doing so, he found that the ship had been ransacked and looted. Clan Sutherland was later repaired and returned to service. She was sold to Japan in 1921 and renamed Shinshu Maru.

The destroyer was overwhelmed and sank quickly with the loss of all hands. A Court of Inquiry found negligence on the part of the master of SS Kenilworth. His instructions had been to hug the coast as closely as possible from Portland Bill to Start Point. Instead he headed straight across, showing no lights nor sounding for fog. At 0315 Kenilworth saw a red light and a ship 'small and low down' at the moment of impact.

Salvage award
The various parties involved in the saving of Clan Sutherland put in their claims for rewards under salvage rules. Following a Court of Admiralty case concluded on 31 July 1918, Mr Justice Hill awarded £6,000 to the Admiralty, which had coordinated the operation. The crew of Boarhound were awarded £500 to be divided between them. The crews of Lois and Woonda were awarded £360. The crew of Fortitude were awarded £300. Lieutenant Irving of Bittern was awarded £300. Captain Edwards of Lois was awarded £200. The crew of Bittern were awarded £900 to be divided between her then 72-man complement (£12 10s each).

Mr Justice Hill criticised the Admiralty for not allowing Captain Calderwood to return to his ship at the earliest opportunity. Addressing the question of the ship being looted, he laid the blame squarely on the crew of Bittern as only men from that ship had been aboard Clan Sutherland the whole time she was under salvage. Irving was criticised for not exercising proper control over his crew or exercising due diligence in preventing or detecting the thefts. As punishment, he ordered that the crew of Bittern forfeit their salvage reward, regardless of whether or not they had been involved in the looting. Although Lieutenant Irving was cleared of any involvement in the looting, his reward was cut to £100.

Pennant numbers

References
NOTE:  All tabular data under General Characteristics only from the listed Jane's Fighting Ships volume unless otherwise specified

Bibliography
 
 
 
 
 
 
 
 

 

Ships built in Barrow-in-Furness
1897 ships
C-class destroyers (1913)
World War I destroyers of the United Kingdom
Ships sunk in collisions
World War I shipwrecks in the English Channel
Maritime incidents in 1917
Maritime incidents in 1918